The 2000 Ballon d'Or, given to the best football player in Europe as judged by a panel of sports journalists from UEFA member countries, was awarded to Luís Figo on 19 December 2000.

Figo was the second Portuguese player to win the award after Eusébio (1965). He was also the third Real Madrid player to win the trophy after Alfredo Di Stéfano (1957, 1959) and Raymond Kopa (1958).

Rankings

Additionally, nineteen players were nominated but received no votes: Sonny Anderson (Brazil and Lyon), Nicolas Anelka (France, Real Madrid and Paris Saint-Germain), Jocelyn Angloma (France and Valencia), Dennis Bergkamp (Netherlands and Arsenal), Hernán Crespo (Argentina, Parma and Lazio), Didier Deschamps (France, Chelsea and Valencia), Marcelo Gallardo (Argentina and Monaco), Geremi (Cameroon and Real Madrid), Ryan Giggs (Wales and Manchester United), Filippo Inzaghi (Italy and Juventus), Patrick M'Boma (Cameroon, Cagliari and Parma), Savo Milošević (Serbia and Montenegro, Zaragoza and Parma), Nuno Gomes (Portugal, Benfica and Fiorentina), Álvaro Recoba (Uruguay and Internazionale), Paul Scholes (England and Manchester United), Marco Simone (Italy and Monaco), Jaap Stam (Netherlands and Manchester United), Sylvain Wiltord (France, Bordeaux and Arsenal) and Boudewijn Zenden (Netherlands and Barcelona).

References

External links
 France Football Official Ballon d'Or page

2000
2000–01 in European football